Hannah Point is a point on the south coast of Livingston Island in the South Shetland Islands, Antarctica. It forms the east side of the entrance to Walker Bay and the west side of the entrance to South Bay. Surmounted by Ustra Peak to the north, with Liverpool Beach extending between the peak and the tip of Hannah Point.  Ice-free area ca. .

The area was visited by early 19th century sealers frequenting nearby Johnsons Dock. The British base camp Station P on the east side of Hannah Point operated from 29 December 1957 until 15 March 1958.

Among the birds that make their home here are the gentoo and macaroni penguins as well as kelp gulls. Southern giant petrels nest here as do blue-eyed shags, skuas, and snowy sheathbills. Southern elephant seals and Antarctic fur seals are among the larger life forms observed at the point.

Hannah Point is one of the most popular Antarctic tourist sites frequented by cruise ships.

The geographical feature is named after the British sealing vessel Hannah hailing from Liverpool and wrecked in the vicinity in 1820 while operating in the South Shetlands.

Location

Maps
 L.L. Ivanov et al. Antarctica: Livingston Island and Greenwich Island, South Shetland Islands. Scale 1:100000 topographic map. Sofia: Antarctic Place-names Commission of Bulgaria, 2005.
 L.L. Ivanov. Antarctica: Livingston Island and Greenwich, Robert, Snow and Smith Islands. Scale 1:120000 topographic map.  Troyan: Manfred Wörner Foundation, 2009.  
 Antarctic Digital Database (ADD). Scale 1:250000 topographic map of Antarctica. Scientific Committee on Antarctic Research (SCAR). Since 1993, regularly upgraded and updated.
 L.L. Ivanov. Antarctica: Livingston Island and Smith Island. Scale 1:100000 topographic map. Manfred Wörner Foundation, 2017.

In fiction
Hannah Point is part of the mise-en-scène of the Antarctica thriller novel The Killing Ship authored by Elizabeth Cruwys and Beau Riffenburgh (under their joint alias Simon Beaufort) in 2016, with action spreading from a field camp at the point westwards to Villard Point on Byers Peninsula via Ivanov Beach.

Notes

References
 Hannah Point. SCAR Composite Antarctic Gazetteer
 Ivanov, L. General Geography and History of Livingston Island. In: Bulgarian Antarctic Research: A Synthesis. Eds. C. Pimpirev and N. Chipev. Sofia: St. Kliment Ohridski University Press, 2015. pp. 17–28. 

Headlands of Livingston Island
Tourism in Antarctica